Axiarcha is a genus of moth in the family Cosmopterigidae. It contains only one species, Axiarcha discosema, which is found in South Africa.

References

External links

Natural History Museum Lepidoptera genus database

Endemic moths of South Africa
Cosmopteriginae
Monotypic moth genera
Moths of Africa